Borrie can refer to:

People
Bob Borrie (1926–1999), Canadian politician in BC
Gilles Borrie (1925–2016), Dutch politician and historian
Gordon Borrie, Baron Borrie (1931–2016), English politician and peer
W. D. Borrie (1913–2000), New Zealand demographer and academic

Other
Borrie Church, medieval church in Scania, Sweden
Lake Borrie Wetlands, coastal wetland in Geelong, Australia